Maruša Krese (13 April 1947 – 7 January 2013) was a Slovene poet, writer and journalist. She lived and worked in Berlin. In 1997 she was awarded the Order of Merit of the Federal Republic of Germany for her humanitarian efforts in the Bosnian War.

Krese was born in Ljubljana in 1947. She studied literature and art history at the University of Ljubljana and psychodrama and Gestalt therapy in the United States in the early 1970s. She worked as a group therapist in Ljubljana and Tübingen and was a Slovene radio correspondent in Berlin in the early 1990s. From 1992 onward she worked as a freelance journalist and writer in Berlin. In 2008 she won the Fabula Award for best collection of short prose in Slovene published within the previous two years for her work Vsi moji božiči (All My Christmases).

Prose
 Vsi moji božiči (All My Christmases), short stories, 2006
 Vse moje vojne (All My Wars), short stories, 2009
 Da me je strah? (That I Am Afraid?), novel, 2012

Poetry
 Danes (Today), 1989
 Postaje (Stations), 1992
 Sarajevo, ljubavi moja (Sarajevo, My Love), 1994
 Beseda (The Word), 1994
 Selbst das Testament ging verloren (Even the Will Was Lost), 2001
 Yorkshire Tasche (Yorkshire Bag), 2003
 Heute nicht (Not Today), 2009

References

Slovenian women poets
Slovenian poets
Slovenian journalists
Slovenian women journalists
1947 births
2013 deaths
Fabula laureates
Slovenian women short story writers
Slovenian short story writers
Recipients of the Cross of the Order of Merit of the Federal Republic of Germany
University of Ljubljana alumni
20th-century poets
20th-century women writers
20th-century short story writers
20th-century Slovenian women writers
20th-century Slovenian writers
21st-century Slovenian women writers
21st-century Slovenian writers